Three in One may refer to:

 3-In-One Oil, a general-purpose lubricating oil
 Three in One (film), a 1957 Australian anthology film
 Three in One, high-occupancy vehicle lane in Indonesia
 3 in 1, 2012 album by Wali
 The Christian concept of the Trinity